Lock(s) may refer to:

Common meanings
Lock and key, a mechanical device used to secure items of importance
Lock (water navigation), a device for boats to transit between different levels of water, as in a canal

Arts and entertainment
Lock (film), a 2016 Punjabi film
Lock (Saga of the Skolian Empire), a sentient machine in the novels by Catherine Asaro
Lock (waltz), a dance figure
Locked (miniseries), Indian web miniseries
The Lock (Constable), an 1824 painting by John Constable
The Lock (Fragonard) or The Bolt, a 1777 painting by Jean-Honoré Fragonard
Locks (album), by Garnet Crow, 2008

People
Lock (surname)
Ormer Locklear (1891–1920), American stunt pilot and film actor nicknamed "Lock"
George Locks (1889–1965), English cricketer
Lock Martin (1916–1959), stage name of American actor Joseph Lockard Martin, Jr.

Places
Lock, Ohio, an unincorporated community in the United States
Lock, South Australia, a small town in the center of the Eyre Peninsula
Lock Island, an island in the River Thames in England
Lock Island (Nunavut), an island Peel Sound in Nunavut, Canada

Sports
Lock (rugby league), a player position in rugby league, known as loose forward in the United Kingdom
Lock (rugby union), a player position in rugby union
Lock, any of several grappling holds in wrestling, judo and other martial arts

Technology

Computing
Lock (computer science), a bookkeeping object used to serialize concurrent access
Lock (database), a feature used when multiple users access a database concurrently
File locking, describes a mechanism that restricts access to a computer file
SIM lock, a restriction on mobile phones to work only in certain countries or with certain providers

Other technologies
Lock and key, a mechanical device used to secure items of importance
Lock (firearm), the ignition mechanism of small arms
Lock (water navigation), a device for boats to transit between different levels of water, as in a canal
Lock (weapons guidance), missile navigation system's target acquisition fix
Fermentation lock, a device in beer and wine making that allows carbon dioxide to escape while not allowing air to enter
Rope lock, a device used in theater fly systems

Other uses
Lock of hair, a piece of hair
Dreadlocks, or locks, rope-like strands of hair formed by locking or braiding

See also

-lock, an Old English suffix
Loch, a Gaelic term used in Scotland to describe lakes and other bodies of water
Lock and Key (disambiguation)
Locke (disambiguation), a common English surname and place name
Locker (disambiguation)
Locking (disambiguation)
LOCKSS (Lots of Copies Keep Stuff Safe), a peer-to-peer network
Lox, cured salmon filet
Unlock (disambiguation)